Garret Wallow (born January 25, 1999) is an American football linebacker for the Houston Texans of the National Football League (NFL). He played college football at TCU and was drafted by the Texans in the fifth round of the 2021 NFL Draft.

Professional career
Wallow was drafted by the Houston Texans in the fifth round, 170th overall, of the 2021 NFL Draft. On May 15, 2021, Wallow signed his four-year rookie contract.

References

Living people
Players of American football from New Orleans
American football linebackers
TCU Horned Frogs football players
Houston Texans players
1999 births